The 2015 King Cup, or The Custodian of The Two Holy Mosques Cup, was the 40th season of King Cup since its establishment in 1957, and the 8th under the current edition.
Al-Shabab was the defending champion but was eliminated by Al Taawon in quarter-finals.

This season's competition featured a total of 32 teams. 14 teams of Pro league, and 16 teams of 1st Division, and 2 teams qualifying from preliminary stage.

The final was held at the King Abdullah Sports City, in Jeddah. Al Hilal won  their first title in the current edition and the seventh in total after beating Al Nassr 7–6 on penalties in the final.

Fixtures and results

Bracket

Note:     H: Home team,   A: Away team

Round of 32
Round of 32 were played on 23 February. 2, 3, 9, 10, & 25 March 2015.

Round of 16
Round of 16 were played on 14, 15, 22, 23, & 30 April 2015.

Quarter-finals
Quarter-finals were played on 1, 2, & 22 May 2015.

Semi-finals
Semi-finals were played on 30 & 31 May.

Final

Top scorers

Source:

See also 
 Saudi Pro League 2014–15
 Saudi 1st Division League 2014–15
 Saudi Crown Prince Cup 2014–15
 Saudi Super Cup

References

2015
2014–15 in Saudi Arabian football
2014–15 domestic association football cups